Hippurites is an extinct genus of rudist bivalve mollusc from the Late Cretaceous of Africa, Asia, Europe, North America, and South America.

Species 
Hippurites atheniensis 
Hippurites colliciatus 
Hippurites cornucopiae 
Hippurites cornuvaccinum

References 

 Hippurites in the Paleobiology Database
 Fossils (Smithsonian Handbooks) by David Ward (Page 112)
  Global Names Index
 Sepkoski's Online Genus Database

Hippuritidae
Prehistoric bivalve genera
Cretaceous bivalves
Cretaceous animals of Africa
Cretaceous animals of Asia
Cretaceous molluscs of Europe
Prehistoric bivalves of North America
Cretaceous animals of South America
Fossil taxa described in 1801